Kupan (also Romanized as Kūpān; also known as Kūyān), Sarchehan District, Bavanat County, Fars Province, Iran. At the 2006 census, its population was 2000, in 360 families.

References 

Populated places in Sarchehan County